The Takoma Langley Crossroads Transit Center is a bus transit center in Langley Park, Maryland. It is at the intersection of University Boulevard and New Hampshire Avenue, and is the largest bus-only transfer in the Washington, D.C. metropolitan area. It is a future transfer point for the Purple Line.

History 
The center was delayed by negotiations over land. Construction started in the spring of 2013, with an expected completion date in the fall of 2015.
The $34.8-million transit center was designed to ease bus transfers and improve pedestrian safety. The station opened for service on December 22, 2016.

The Purple Line system is under construction as of 2022 and is scheduled to open in 2026.

Station layout

Bus Station

Purple Line station
The future Purple Line station will consist of an island platform on the median of University Boulevard just west of New Hampshire Avenue.

Routes

References

External links 

MTA Page

Bus stations in Maryland
Langley Park, Maryland
Transportation in Prince George's County, Maryland
Transport infrastructure completed in 2016
Purple Line (Maryland)
Takoma Park, Maryland